Marcus Aurelius Claudius Quintillus (died 270) was a Roman emperor. He was a brother of Emperor Claudius Gothicus, whom he succeeded after Claudius' death in 270.  Quintillus' claim to be emperor was challenged by Aurelian, who was proclaimed emperor by the legions he commanded.  Quintillus' reign lasted no more than six months.  Different sources report his cause of death as murder by his own soldiers, in battle with Aurelian, or by suicide.

Early life
Marcus Aurelius Claudius Quintillus' exact birthplace is unknown. An Illyrian, he was likely born in Pannonia Inferior, as is indicated by his coinage. Originating from a low-born family, Quintillus came to prominence with the accession of his brother Claudius Gothicus to the imperial throne in 268. Quintillus was possibly made Procurator of Sardinia during his brother's reign.

Reign of Quintillus
Quintillus was declared emperor either by the Senate or by his brother's soldiers upon the latter's death in 270. Eutropius reports Quintillus to have been elected by soldiers of the Roman army immediately following the death of his brother; the choice was reportedly approved by the Roman Senate. Joannes Zonaras reports him elected by the Senate itself. Records, however, agree that the legions which had followed Claudius in campaigning along the Danube were either unaware or disapproving of Quintillus' elevation. They instead elevated their current leader Aurelian as emperor.

The few records of Quintillus' reign are contradictory. They disagree on the length of his reign, variously reported to have lasted 17 days (Jerome, Eutropius and Zonaras) or 77 days (Filocalus, Zosimus gives "a few months"). Modern scholars believe "17" to be a misreading of a larger number, as there is an abundance of coins produced during his reign. Records also disagree on the cause of his death. The Historia Augusta reports him murdered by his own soldiers in reaction to his strict  military discipline. Jerome only reports that he was slain at Aquileia. Joannes Zonaras reported Quintillus to have committed suicide by opening his veins and bleeding himself to death; John of Antioch reports the suicide to have been assisted by a physician. Claudius Salmasius noted that Dexippus recorded the death without stating causes. All records, however, agree in placing the death at Aquileia. Quintillus was reportedly survived by his two sons.

The Historia Augusta reports Claudius and Quintillus having another brother named Crispus and through him a niece, Claudia, who reportedly married Eutropius and was mother to Constantius Chlorus. Some historians however suspect this account to be a genealogical fabrication to flatter Constantine I.

Legacy

His reign was very short and he never managed to visit Rome as emperor. Surviving Roman records considered Quintillus a moderate and capable emperor. He was seen as a champion of the Senate and thus compared to previous emperors Galba and Pertinax. All three were highly regarded by senatorial sources despite their failure to survive a full year of reign. In his reign the priestly offices held by the emperor were separated and the image of the emperor as pontifex maximus was abandoned.

See also
 List of Roman emperors

References

Sources

Ancient sources

Secondary sources

 
 Jones, A.H.M.; Martindale, J.R., Morris, J. (1971). Quintillus 1. The Prosopography of the Later Roman Empire I. Cambridge University Press, p. 759. 

3rd-century Roman emperors
Crisis of the Third Century
Ancient Romans who committed suicide
Suicides by sharp instrument in Italy
210s births
270 deaths
Year of birth uncertain
Year of birth unknown
Illyrian people
Aurelii
Claudii
Illyrian emperors